In enzymology, an inosinate nucleosidase is an enzyme that catalyzes the chemical reaction

5'-inosinate + H2O  D-ribose 5-phosphate + hypoxanthine

Thus, the two substrates of this enzyme are 5'-inosinate and H2O, whereas its two products are D-ribose 5-phosphate and hypoxanthine.

This enzyme belongs to the family of hydrolases, specifically those glycosylases that hydrolyse N-glycosyl compounds.  The systematic name of this enzyme class is 5'-inosinate phosphoribohydrolase. This enzyme participates in purine metabolism.

References

 

EC 3.2.2
Enzymes of unknown structure